Norris Brown (May 2, 1863January 5, 1960) was a Senator from Nebraska.

Brown was born in Maquoketa, Iowa. The son of William Henry Harrison and Eliza Ann Phelps Brown, he attended Jefferson Iowa Academy and graduated with a law degree from the University of Iowa College of Law in Iowa City, Iowa, in 1883. He was admitted to the bar in 1884 and commenced his law practice in Perry, Iowa. He moved to Kearney, Nebraska, in 1888 and continued the practice of law.  Brown was the prosecuting attorney of Buffalo County from 1892 to 1896, the deputy attorney general of Nebraska from 1900 to 1905, and the attorney general of Nebraska from 1905 to 1907. He distinguished himself in this post by winning a tax suit of over a million dollars against the railroads. The money was used to open schools in Nebraska.

Brown was elected as a Republican to the United States Senate and served from March 4, 1907, to March 3, 1913. During his term he served as the chairman of the Committee on Patents (Sixty-first and Sixty-second Congresses). He proposed permitting an income tax, later incorporated into the 16th Amendment of the U.S. Constitution. He was an unsuccessful candidate for renomination in 1912. He then resumed the practice of law in Omaha where he became senior partner in the firm of Brown, Crossman, West, Barton, and Quinlan. He served as attorney for the Omaha Stockyards for 30 years.

In 1942, he retired and moved to Seattle, Washington. Brown died there January 5, 1960, and was interred in Forest Lawn Cemetery in Omaha.

Brown was married twice. In 1885, he married Lula K. Beeler, who died in 1925. They had two daughters. Ann L. Howland became his second wife in 1927. She died in 1937.

References

 at the Nebraska State Historical Society

1863 births
1960 deaths
Nebraska lawyers
Nebraska Republicans
Iowa lawyers
Nebraska Attorneys General
American Congregationalists
University of Iowa College of Law alumni
Republican Party United States senators from Nebraska
People from Maquoketa, Iowa
Washington (state) Republicans
People from Kearney, Nebraska